Live from Madison Square Garden may refer to:

 Live from Madison Square Garden (O.A.R. album), 2007
 Live from Madison Square Garden (Eric Clapton and Steve Winwood album), 2009
 WWE Live from Madison Square Garden, a 2015 professional wrestling event

See also
 Live at Madison Square Garden (disambiguation)
 Madison Square Garden, eponymous venue